David Ricardo (1803 – 17 May 1864) was a British Liberal Member of Parliament.

He was the son of David Ricardo of Gatcombe Park and educated at Charterhouse School (1812–1815) and Trinity College, Cambridge. He succeeded his father in 1823, inheriting the family seat at Gatcombe Park.

He was appointed High Sheriff of Gloucestershire for 1830–31. and elected MP for Stroud in 1832 but "took the Chiltern Hundreds" in 1833.

He married Catherine, the daughter of William Thomas St Quintin, of Scampston Hall, Yorkshire, and had two sons and a daughter.
He was succeeded at Gatcombe by his second son, Henry David, his first son having died in infancy.

References

1803 births
1864 deaths
Politicians from London
Jewish British politicians
People educated at Charterhouse School
Alumni of Trinity College, Cambridge
Liberal Party (UK) MPs for English constituencies
UK MPs 1832–1835
High Sheriffs of Gloucestershire